Edison Ames (born 28 May 1985 in Merauke, Papua) is an Indonesian footballer who plays as a defender for Persidafon Dafonsoro.

Honours

Club honors
Persipura Jayapura
Indonesia Super League (1): 2008–09
Indonesian Community Shield (1): 2009

References

External links
 Profile Edison Ames
 

1985 births
Living people
Indonesian footballers
People from Merauke Regency
Persipura Jayapura players
Persidafon Dafonsoro players
Liga 1 (Indonesia) players
Association football defenders
Sportspeople from Papua
21st-century Indonesian people